Peter Rodulfo (born 1958) is a British artist and sculptor who spent much of his childhood travelling across India and Australia, before settling in Norwich, UK. He studied at the Norwich school of Art and Design (now Norwich University of the Arts) from 1975 to 1979. While based in Norwich he has travelled extensively; he was artist in residence at The Barony of Fulwood Trust Foundation Goiana, Brazil in 2004, and artist in residence at Shenzhen, China during 2012–13 and in 2016, Artist in Residence at The Barony of Fulwood Trust, Open For Art Project at Fundao, Portugal.

Rodulfo re-located to the Norfolk coastal town of Great Yarmouth in 2012 where he is a member of the 'Yarmouth Six'. He is also, conjointly with Mark Burrell, a leading member of the art movement known as the North Sea Magical Realists.

Themes and influences
Rodulfo is a prolific painter, working predominantly in oils on canvas, occasionally in the medium of sculpture. His paintings are loosely associated in their imagery and symbolism to Magical Realism, exploring themes, often with great humour, such as love and loss, the erosion of memory, natural and fantasy landscape, the elements, along animals, real and imaginary.

His art is thematically and stylistically similar to the work of Paul Klee, Max Ernst and the British surrealist Leonora Carrington (1917–2011). However his influences, along with the subject-matter, style and imagery of his paintings remain wide and experimental, occasionally esoteric.

One art critic appraises his work thus –

Exhibitions

Rodulfo has now exhibited his paintings over a time-span of 35 years in many cities and countries, including France, Switzerland, Miami and New York, Brazil, Hong Kong and China, as well as throughout the UK.
 " 2021 "  The Art Gallery - Lowestoft. ( www.theartgallery.uk. ) Nov. 6th -27th
 2018 Walk through Walls, Peter Rodulfo's Yarmouth Collection Skippings Gallery, Great Yarmouth
 2015 PAINT Norwich Market Undercroft, 7–30 November
 2015  Halesworth Gallery, Suffolk 15 August – 5 September
 2014  Feng Lin Shan shui International art exhibition, Shenzhen, China –
 Divine, Define Feminine. London. UK
 Great Yarmouth Library Norfolk with Mark Burrell
 2013  Solo show.  Da Wang cultural Highlands, Shenzhen, China
 2012  'Outside the white cube'. Open show Bermondsey, London – Open show. Radcliffe's and Newman's.
   London -'Vision and Reality'. Norwich Castle Museum.
  'Race into time', two person show with Stephen Vince. The Gallery, Cork St. London
 2011 Two person show with Mark Burrell at Norwich Playhouse.
 2007 Solo show "from Basel to Brasilia" Miami USA
 2006 Retrospective exhibition. Thin Cube Gallery, UK'
 2005 Cor da Carne. Brasilia, Brazil – Landscape 200, Castle Open Art Show, Norwich Castle Museum. UK.
 2004 Solo show Flamboyant, Gioania, Brazil – Cor da Carne, Gioania, Brazil
  Solo show Brazilian art exchange gallery, Brasilia, Brazil.
 2003  'Brave Destiny', New York and Florida
 2002 Solo show Auditorio Ambrosio Orepeza, Venezuela – Art of Imagination open show Cork St. London
  Solo show Gallerie du Marche, Montreux, Switzerland.
 2000   Kelburn Castle, Glasgow – Royal Academy Summer Show, London
 1999   Heifer Gallery, London
 1998   Wahrenberger Gallery, Zurich – Sculpture Trail, Burgh Apton, Norfolk – New York Expo, New York
 1997   Wrentham Studios – "Shock of the New" – Suffolk Polish Cultural Institute, London – Bergh Apton Sculpture Trail, Norfolk
 1996   Miami Art Fair, USA – New Mill Gallery, Norwich – Heifer Gallery, London – Price Waterhouse, London
 1995   Art'95 "Savannah", London – Contemporary Print Fair – The Barbican, London
 1994   One Man Show – Heifer Gallery, London – Peterborough Museum – Heifer Gallery, Peterborough, Southwark Arts Festival, London
 Miami Art Fair – Ho Gallery, USA
 1993   Castle Art Show ~ Castle Museum, Norwich – Touchstone Gallery, Hong Kong
 1992   Royal Cliff, Pattaya, Thailand, Smith's Gallery, London –  Mysterious Presence, Norwich – V.A.C. Hong Kong Museum, Hong Kong
 1991   Art'91 Business Design Centre, Royal Society London
   Birmingham Smith's Gallery, London,
  One Man Show – Village Gallery, London
 1990  Larger Works – Arcade Gallery, Norwich, Art'90 – Business Design Centre, London – Centre d'Art Contemporin, Rouen –
 School House Gallery, Wighton,
  One Man Show Contact Gallery, Norwich
 1988  Men at Work – Contact Gallery, Norwich – Larger Works – Arcade Gallery, Norwich, One Man Show – Dan lan De Bairead Gallery, London
 School House Gallery, Wighton – One Man Show – Contact Gallery, Norwich
 1987 One Man Show – Arts Centre, Lowestoft –  Jablonski Gallery, London
 1986 One Man Show – Kingsgate Gallery, London
 1985  Margaret Fisher, London
 1984  School House Gallery, Wighton
 1983  Norwich 20's – Caste Museum, Norwich, Manfred Schuler Gallery, Zurich, One Man Show – Christ's Hospital, Horsham
 1982 Solo Show – Margaret Fisher, London – Six Artists of Individuality, Ipswich – Norwich 20's – UEA, Norwich
 1981 – Maddermarket Theatre, Norwich – Solo Show – Woodstock Gallery, London
 1980 – Norwich 20's Castle Museum, Norwich – Solo show Margaret Fisher gallery, London
 1978  Solo Show -Rare Bird, Norwich

References

External links
 Peter Rodulfo Art
 A film about Peter Rodulfo
 Recent work by Peter Rodulfo
 'As the Elephant Laughed': An evening with Peter Rodulfo
 Rodulfo's Mandala of Loving-Kindness
 Peter Rodulfo's 'As the Elephant Laughed': a Panorama of Evolution

British contemporary artists
1958 births
21st-century British artists
Living people
People associated with Norwich University of the Arts